This is a list of rivers in Montenegro.

Bijela
Bistrica
Bukovica
Bojana
Cijevna
Ćehotina
Grnčar
Ibar
Komarnica
Lim
Lještanica
Ljuboviđa
Ljuča
Morača
Mrtvica
Ospanica
Piva
Ribnica
Rijeka Crnojevića
Sitnica
Šavnik
Tara
Trebišnjica
Veruša
Vrmoša
Zeta
Željeznica

Gallery

References

 
Montenegro
Rivers